The Wrecking Crew is a spy novel written by Donald Hamilton and first published in 1960. It was the second novel featuring Hamilton's ongoing protagonist, counter-agent and assassin Matt Helm. In this book Hamilton continued the hard-headed and gritty realism he had built up around Helm in the first novel of the series, Death of a Citizen.

Film adaptation

The Wrecking Crew was loosely adapted in 1969 as a motion picture starring Dean Martin as Matt Helm. This was the fourth and final instalment in the commercially popular but critically derided film series, which took great liberties with Hamilton's original serious novels, turning them into campy comedies.

Sequel
Hamilton's final published Matt Helm novel, The Damagers from 1993, is a sequel to this book, featuring the son of this novel's villain as its antagonist.

External links
 The synopsis and a summary

1960 American novels
American novels adapted into films
Matt Helm novels